Cyperus moutona is a species of sedge that is native to the Marquesas Islands in the Pacific Ocean.

See also 
 List of Cyperus species

References 

moutona
Plants described in 1931
Flora of the Marquesas Islands
Taxa named by Forest B.H. Brown